Carnelian Bay (formerly, Cornelian Bay) is an unincorporated community on the shore of Lake Tahoe in Placer County, California, United States. 
The Cornelian Bay post office operated from 1883 to 1887 and from 1891 to 1893. The Carnelian Bay post office opened in 1908.

For statistical purposes, the United States Census Bureau has defined Carnelian Bay as a census-designated place (CDP). The census definition of the area may not precisely correspond to local understanding of the area with the same name. The population was 524 at the 2010 census.

Nearby cities and towns include: Tahoe Vista, Brockway, Kings Beach, Crystal Bay, Incline Village, Truckee, Tahoma, Homewood, and Tahoe City. Its ZIP code is 96140 and its area code 530.

Geography
According to the United States Census Bureau, the CDP covers an area of 1.3 square miles (3.4 km), 99.82% of it land, and 0.18% of it water.

Demographics

At the 2010 census Carnelian Bay had a population of 524. The racial makeup of Carnelian Bay was 493 (94.1%) White, 1 (0.2%) African American, 4 (0.8%) Native American, 14 (2.7%) Asian, 0 (0.0%) Pacific Islander, 1 (0.2%) from other races, and 11 (2.1%) from two or more races. Hispanic or Latino of any race were 13 people (2.5%).

The whole population lived in households, no one lived in non-institutionalized group quarters and no one was institutionalized.

There were 256 households, 38 (14.8%) had children under the age of 18 living in them, 113 (44.1%) were opposite-sex married couples living together, 14 (5.5%) had a female householder with no husband present, 11 (4.3%) had a male householder with no wife present.  There were 19 (7.4%) unmarried opposite-sex partnerships, and 3 (1.2%) same-sex married couples or partnerships. 78 households (30.5%) were one person and 26 (10.2%) had someone living alone who was 65 or older. The average household size was 2.05.  There were 138 families (53.9% of households); the average family size was 2.45.

The age distribution was 60 people (11.5%) under the age of 18, 39 people (7.4%) aged 18 to 24, 127 people (24.2%) aged 25 to 44, 184 people (35.1%) aged 45 to 64, and 114 people (21.8%) who were 65 or older.  The median age was 49.3 years. For every 100 females, there were 126.8 males.  For every 100 females age 18 and over, there were 126.3 males.

There were 947 housing units at an average density of 726.5 per square mile, of the occupied units 171 (66.8%) were owner-occupied and 85 (33.2%) were rented. The homeowner vacancy rate was 10.0%; the rental vacancy rate was 7.9%.  345 people (65.8% of the population) lived in owner-occupied housing units and 179 people (34.2%) lived in rental housing units.

References

Census-designated places in Placer County, California
Lake Tahoe
Populated places in the Sierra Nevada (United States)